The 1999 Clásica de Almería was the 14th edition of the Clásica de Almería cycle race and was held on 28 February 1999. The race started in Puebla de Vícar and finished in Vera. The race was won by Ján Svorada.

General classification

References

1999
1999 in Spanish road cycling
February 1999 sports events in Europe